Zipper Catches Skin is the seventh solo studio album by American rock singer Alice Cooper, released on August 25, 1982 by Warner Bros. Records.

Album background
The album was co-produced by bassist Erik Scott alongside Cooper. Cooper blended new wave and pop rock music into his hard rock style in an attempt to keep up with changing musical trends. Scott stated the album "was meant to be lean, stripped down, and low on frills. Punkish and bratty."
At the time, Cooper described Zipper Catches Skin as "totally kill. Real hardcore. The stuff that I do has always been a lot like that. In fact, I invented a couple of songs that were remakes of other songs, just for the purpose of attacking clichés. There are no clichés on this album, and I did that for a specific reason. Rock and roll right now is jammed with clichés." Cooper described the photograph of him on the album's back cover as "very Haggar slacks. I look good. I look like a GQ ad, only I'm zipping up my pants and you can see definite pain on my face."

Long-time Cooper guitarist Dick Wagner, who left halfway through the recording sessions, described Zipper Catches Skin as "the off to the races speedy album" and a "drug induced nightmare". Wagner later revealed in a segment of the Deleted Scenes on the 2014 documentary film Super Duper Alice Cooper that Cooper was smoking crack cocaine at the time and had a curtain set up behind the recording mic with a stool on it where he kept his crack pipe; he and other members of the band would sneak behind the curtain to take hits in between recording takes.

Zipper Catches Skin is the second of three albums which Cooper refers to as his "blackout" albums, the others being the preceding album, Special Forces (1981), and the following album, DaDa (1983), as he has no recollection of recording them, due to the substance abuse, although he did manage to film a television advertisement intended to promote Zipper at the time. Cooper stated "I wrote them, recorded them and toured them and I don't remember much of any of that", though he actually toured only Special Forces. There was no tour to promote Zipper, and none of its songs have ever been played live. Despite this, Cooper has said he is proud of the music, and is surprised how good it is despite his state at the time. Also expressing his desire for the albums to be re-recorded to some degree...."I would actually like to go back and re-record those three albums because I never really gave them their due. I love the songs – I just don't remember writing them. My subconscious was writing some pretty good tracks! There's 'Zorro's Ascent' and 'No Baloney Homosapiens' for example where now I'm going, "Wow, that's clever!" (laughs).

Album reception
Despite its first single "I Am the Future" being featured in the film Class of 1984 as its theme song, and the Waitresses' Patty Donahue appearing on its other single "I Like Girls", Zipper Catches Skin failed to chart in most countries, including in the US where it became Cooper's first album to not dent the Billboard Top 200 since Easy Action (1970).
In a 30th anniversary look-back, Ultimate Classic Rock described it "an off-kilter hybrid of the Knack and the Cars."

In a retrospective review for AllMusic, critic Donald A. Guarisco wrote that ".. while it's not a success on the level of Billion Dollar Babies or Welcome to My Nightmare, it is surprisingly listenable. The songwriting subjects are some of the most unusual of Cooper's career, which is saying a lot: "Tag, You're It" is a primarily spoken word spoof of slasher films, while "Zorro's Ascent" depicts the world's most famous swordsman facing down death. However, the strangest of these songs is "I'm Alive (That Was the Day My Dead Pet Returned to Save My Life)," which speaks for itself. These lyrics are often too cutesy for their own good, but this is effectively made up for by the well-crafted, tuneful music that backs them up. Cooper is also assisted by an enthusiastic and energetic performance by the band, who transform tunes like "I Better Be Good" and "Remarkably Insincere" into effective fusions of hard rock riffing and new wave staccato rhythms. While the experimental spirit that drives these songs is refreshing, none of the songs ever jells in a way that would create a cohesive album and none of the songs is strong enough to join the ranks of classics like "School's Out" or "No More Mr. Nice Guy." That said, Zipper Catches Skin contains enough solid tracks to make it a worthwhile listen for hardcore Alice Cooper fans."

Track listing

Personnel
Credits are adapted from the Zipper Catches Skin liner notes.

Musicians
 Alice Cooper – vocals, synthesizer
 Dick Wagner – guitar
 Mike Pinera – guitar
 Erik Scott – bass
 Jan Uvena – drums, percussion
 John Nitzinger – guitar
 Billy Steele – guitar
 Duane Hitchings – synthesizer
 Craig Krampf – percussion
 Frannie Golde – backing vocals
 Joanne Harris – backing vocals
 Flo & Eddie – backing vocals
 Patty Donahue – guest vocals and "sarcasm" on "I Like Girls"

References

External links
 

Alice Cooper albums
1982 albums
Warner Records albums